The 2009 European Parliament election in Lithuania  was the election of the delegation from Lithuania to the European Parliament in 2009. It was a part of the wider 2009 European Parliament election.  The Homeland Union (European Peoples Party) doubled their representation from 2 to 4, whilst Labour shrank from 5 to 1.

Results
15 political parties were competing in the elections, of which 6 won seats. Lithuania has 12 seats in the European Parliament.

See also
MEPs for Lithuania 2009–2014
Members of the European Parliament 2009–2014

References

Lithuania
European Parliament elections in Lithuania
European